Massachusetts Senate's 2nd Plymouth and Bristol district in the United States is one of 40 legislative districts of the Massachusetts Senate. It covers 1.4% of Bristol County and 31.0% of Plymouth County population in 2010. Democrat Michael Brady of Brockton has represented the district since 2015. Candidates running for this district seat in the 2020 Massachusetts general election include Moises Rodrigues.

Towns represented
The district includes the following localities:
 Brockton
 parts of East Bridgewater
 parts of Easton
 Halifax
 Hanover
 Hanson
 Plympton
 Whitman

Senators 
Michael C. Creedon, 1995–1997
 Robert S. Creedon Jr., 1997–2008
 Thomas P. Kennedy, 2009–2015
 Michael D. Brady, 2015-current

See also
 List of Massachusetts Senate elections
 List of Massachusetts General Courts
 List of former districts of the Massachusetts Senate
 Bristol County districts of the Massachusetts House of Representatives: 1st, 2nd, 3rd, 4th, 5th, 6th, 7th, 8th, 9th, 10th, 11th, 12th, 13th, 14th
 Plymouth County districts of the Massachusetts House of Representatives: 1st, 2nd, 3rd, 4th, 5th, 6th, 7th, 8th, 9th, 10th, 11th, 12th

Images
Portraits of legislators

References

Further reading

External links
 Ballotpedia
  (State Senate district information based on U.S. Census Bureau's American Community Survey).
  (video)

Senate 
Government of Bristol County, Massachusetts
Government of Plymouth County, Massachusetts
Massachusetts Senate